Charles Augustine Reilley (born Charlse Augustine O'Reilly; 1856 – November 4, 1904) was a Major League Baseball player for parts of five seasons.

Career
Charles was a catcher for most of his career, but did play in the outfield and occasionally some infield positions as well. He finished his career with 92 hits in 439 at bats for a .210 batting average, while playing in 119 games.

Post-career
After his baseball career, one of his known occupations was a steam fitter. Charles died in his hometown of Providence and is interred at Mount St. Mary Cemetery in Pawtucket, Rhode Island.

References

External links

Baseball players from Providence, Rhode Island
Major League Baseball catchers
19th-century baseball players
Troy Trojans players
Cincinnati Reds (1876–1879) players
Detroit Wolverines players
Worcester Ruby Legs players
Providence Grays players
Boston Reds (UA) players
1856 births
1904 deaths
Lynn Live Oaks players
New Bedford (minor league baseball) players
New Haven (minor league baseball) players
Worcester (minor league baseball) players
Rockville (minor league baseball) players
New Britain (minor league baseball) players